Cape Palinuro (Italian : Capo Palinuro) is located in southwestern Italy, approximately 50 miles (80 km) southeast of Salerno, in southern part of Cilento region. It is supposedly named after Palinurus, the helmsman of Aeneas' ship in Virgil's Aeneid.

Geography
Located on the Tyrrhenian Sea, the northern side of the cape is the location of Palinuro, a touristic hamlet of Centola. Southern side faces in the Gulf of Policastro, and is 6 km from Marina di Camerota.
It features a lighthouse that is the second highest (70 meters or 230 feet), in all of Italy.

See also
Capo Palinuro Lighthouse

References

External links
 Palinuro information website

Palinuro
Cilento
Landforms of Campania